Incap Corporation is a Finnish contract electronics manufacturer. Incap's headquarters are located in Helsinki, Finland, and its shares are listed on the Helsinki Stock Exchange.

History

The birth of Incap 
Incap was founded in 1992 when Kera merged Teknoinvest, Lakespo, and Keraspo, three development companies from northern Finland, into one. Kera founded Keraspo in the 1980s.

1993–2002 
The company consolidated operations into two specialty industries: electronics and furniture. In the 1990s, its primary customers included Abloy, Jysk, IKEA, and Asko.

Incap Furniture manufactured pine furniture in Oulu. After the mid-1990s, the company cut back on both the number of customers it served and the products it offered and focused on serving ten international clients with approximately two hundred products.

In 1996, Incap merged with Elektrostep.

In the spring of 1997, Incap was listed on the Helsinki Stock Exchange. Incap's turnover was 314 million Finnish markkas. The next year, Kera merged with the Finnish Guarantee Board (Valtiontakuukeskus), forming the company Finnvera.

By 1999, the company manufactured cash registers, weather observation devices, and road traffic and industrial automation systems. A year later Incap established a subsidiary, Incap Electronics Estonia OÜ, in Kuressaare, Estonia. Incap Electronics already had three factories in Sotkamo, Helsinki, and Vaasa. In May, the company's Board of Directors appointed a CFO, Rauni Nokela, to replace Tero Frey. The company also stated that it planned to sell its furniture business.

In 2001, Incap's largest owner, Finnvera, held 43 percent of the company's shares, Conventum owned more than one-fifth, and Sampo less than one-tenth. The next year, Incap Electronics merged with Incap Corporation. At the same time, the ownership of Incap Furniture was transferred to its management team with the help of private equity investors. The companies were completely separated, but they kept using the name Incap.

2003–2009 

By 2004, Incap produced electronics for airport security gates, dive computers, parts for Vaisala weather probes, and electronics for elevators. The company's largest owners were JMC Finance and Finnvera.

In January 2005, Incap purchased a combination machine from Finn-Power Oy that could perform both punching and laser cutting. The equipment improved the company's sheet metal products manufacturing capacity. In April, Incap sold its machining and coating business to RuukkiComp Oy. In May, Incap became a subcontractor to Assa Abloy. The contract included volume production, design, production, pilot series production, and final assembly of electronics and mechanics.

In 2006, Incap established Incap Contract Manufacturing Pvt. Ltd. in Bangalore. The following year, Incap acquired a contract manufacturing business in Tumkur, near Bangalore in India. TVS Electronics became Incap Contract Manufacturing.

2010–2019 
In March 2010, Incap announced that it would relocate production from the Vuokatti factory to Estonia. The projected annual savings of the relocation were approximately 3 million euros. The production was moved to Estonia. The production facilities at the Kuressaare factory were doubled starting in 2011. Incap's largest plant was located in India, with more than 350 employees.

In 2012, Incap closed its factory in Helsinki. Production was transferred to Vaasa, Kuressaare, and subcontractors. The company's turnover was almost 65 million euros.

In June 2013, the company sold the factory property to Vuokatti Superpark Oy, which ran the Angry Birds activity park on the property for almost a year. By 2013, Incap had held several cooperation negotiations. Relief from the financial situation was sought through acquisitions in July, in which Inission became Incap's largest owner as the contract manufacturer received a 26 percent stake in the company. At this point, Incap employed about 600 people in Finland, Estonia, India and China. The companies planned to merge Incap with Inission but Inission decided against the merger.

In the spring 2014, Incap agreed to expand its production facilities in India, where it manufactured power supplies, inverters, UPS equipment, filling station electronics, and electric actuators. In June, Ville Vuori started as the Group's President and CEO, succeeding Fredrik Berghel.

In September 2018, Otto Pukk, who had managed Incap Estonia since November 2015, became CEO of Incap.

2020–present 

In January 2020, Incap announced the acquisition of AWS Electronics Group. The share issue was completed in February 2021. AWS Electronics operated in the United Kingdom and Slovakia. In autumn 2020, Incap shareholders were offered nearly 1.5 million new shares worth nearly 11 million euros.

In 2021, Incap nearly doubled its operating profit, despite the global shortage of components. The company had operations in Finland, India, Estonia, the United Kingdom, and Slovakia.

In May 2022, Incap's share was split, and the number of shares increased fivefold.

Products 
Incap provides services for life cycle design and material sourcing of electromechanical products, as well as product manufacturing and maintenance services. The company's customers have included Nokia, Vaisala, Metso Automation, Oras, Suunto, Kone, and General Electric.

Major products and clients:
 Electronic locking system programming devices for Assa Abloy
 Components for synchronous machines for ABB, which supplied synchronous machines for engines in the metal industry, marine propeller engines and generators, and generators for diesel land power plants
 Stator components for The Switch wind turbines
 Solar powered streetlights for Naps Systems
 Control electronics for Tulikivi heaters
 Electronics assemblies for Kemppi's MIG welding machine
 Production lines for Corvus Energy

References

External links 
 

Companies listed on Nasdaq Helsinki
Electronics companies of Finland
Companies established in 1992
Companies based in Helsinki